The Rhodes Colossus is an editorial cartoon illustrated by English cartoonist Edward Linley Sambourne and published by Punch magazine in 1892. It alludes to the Scramble for Africa during the New Imperialism period, in which the European powers, beginning in 1884, expanded their colonial expansion in Africa by dividing the continent up amongst themselves.

The image depicts British business magnate Cecil Rhodes as a giant standing over the continent holding a telegraphic line, a reference to his desire to build a "Cape to Cairo" rail and telegraph line and connect most of the British colonies in Africa. It is a visual pun based on the Colossus of Rhodes, one of the Seven Wonders of the Ancient World.

History
The Rhodes Colossus was drawn by English cartoonist Edward Linley Sambourne, and first appeared in Punch magazine in 1892. It was widely reprinted, and has since become a standard illustration in history texts.

The cartoon was published in the 10 December 1892 edition of Punch, accompanied by a recent excerpt from The Times about a Rhodes plan to extend an electrical telegraph line from Cape Town to Cairo. The excerpt from The Times reads: Mr. Rhodes announced that it was his intention, either with the help of his friends or by himself, to continue the telegraph northwards, across the Zambesi, through Nyassaland, and along Lake Tanganyika to Uganda. Nor is this all.... This colossal Monte Cristo means to cross the Soudan ... and to complete the overland telegraph line from Cape Town to Cairo; that is, from England to the whole of her possessions or colonies, or 'spheres of influence' in Africa.The cartoon and excerpt were followed by a piece of satirical verse by Edwin J. Milliken, on the character and ambitions of Rhodes. Satirical verses and stories often accompanied cartoons in Punch magazine. In the verse, Rhodes is described as a "Director and Statesman in one" and a "Seven-League-Booted Colossus" that stands "O'er Africa striding from dark end to end, to forward black emancipation." He is also described as a "shrewd trader" and a "diplomat full of finesse and sharp schemes with a touch of the pious Crusader".

The Rhodes as Colossus pun used in this artwork was a well-known joke that originated in South Africa and that Punch had used before, as well as many others.

Iconography 

Sambourne illustrated this visual pun to depict Cecil Rhodes as the ancient Greek statue the Colossus of Rhodes, one of the Seven Wonders of the Ancient World, following the traditional (and architecturally unlikely) depiction of the Colossus with wide-set legs across Rhodes harbour (above).

Rhodes measures with the telegraphic line the distance from Cape Town (at his right foot) in South Africa to Cairo (at his left foot) in Egypt, illustrating his broader "Cape to Cairo" concept for further colonial expansion in Africa. In his right hand Rhodes holds a pith helmet with a rifle slung around his right shoulder.

Rhodes stands in a powerful, open armed stance. This has been seen by scholars an indication of his power and influence during the European colonisation of Africa. His giant size indicates his larger than life aspirations and desire for further influence in the continent.

Influence

The cartoon quickly became widely referenced in historical texts as an illustrated representation of the Scramble for Africa, and the New Imperialism era as a whole. The original context of a proposed telegraph line is rarely mentioned in such reproductions, which take the "Cape to Cairo" concept more generally.

In Adam Hochschild's King Leopold’s Ghost: A Story of Greed, Terror, and Heroism, in Colonial Africa, Rhodes is introduced as the "future South African politician and diamond magnate" who claimed he "would annex the planets" if he could. The South African cartoonist Jonathan Shapiro parodied the cartoon in a 2009 work by placing Chinese premier Wen Jiabao in place of Rhodes holding up Nkosazana Dlamini-Zuma, the-then Minister of International Relations and Cooperation (as a marionette) while the Dalai Lama looks on from Asia. The cartoon satirized Sino-African relations in general, and recent China–South Africa relations in particular, after the Dalai Lama was denied a visa to attend an international peace conference in Johannesburg, a move that was perceived to be the result of Chinese diplomatic pressure.

In 2013, political cartoonist Martin Rowson referenced Sambourne's cartoon in an satirical illustration published on 1 February in The Guardian on British Prime Minister David Cameron's policies regarding Algeria and the French intervention in Mali.

Legacy 
The cartoon has become one of the most frequently used images to represent the era of New Imperialism and the European colonisation of Africa. Rhodes' legacy in modern-day South Africa has been described by scholar Patrick Bond as "one of the world's most lucrative, and destructive", referencing the numerous fraudulent and misleading treaties he signed with various African peoples which ceded portions of their territory to him.

See also
 Rhodes Must Fall

References

Further reading
Punch, 10 December 1892, from Project Gutenberg
 Sven Lindqvist, Joan Tate, and Sarah Death. The Dead Do Not Die. New York: The New Press, 2014. .

Editorial cartoons
Works about New Imperialism
British colonisation in Africa
British Empire
1892 works
Cultural depictions of Cecil Rhodes
Works originally published in Punch (magazine)
1882 in Africa
Colossus of Rhodes